Walter Francis Roch (20 January 1880 – 3 March 1965), sometime MP (Lib.) for Pembrokeshire from 1908 to 1918 was a Welsh politician and landowner, whose political career ended when he continued to support H.H. Asquith over David Lloyd George.

Background
Roch was born the second son of William Francis Roch, J.P., of Butter Hill, Pembrokeshire (who died in 1889) and his wife Emily Catherine Powell (she died in 1938), the second daughter of a Welsh Liberal politician Walter R.H. Powell, of Maesgwynne, Llanboidy, Carmarthenshire, MP (Lib.) for Carmarthenshire, 1880–85, and West Carmarthenshire, 1885–89. He was educated at Twyford and Harrow Schools. He married Hon. Fflorens Mary Ursula Herbert (1879-1969), on 20 April 1911. Fflorens was a published author and Chief Commissioner for Girl Guides in Wales. Roch was also a barrister at the Middle Temple from 1913.

1908 Pembrokeshire by-election
The Pembrokeshire by-election was held on 16 July 1908.  The by-election was held due to the elevation to the peerage of the incumbent Liberal MP, John Wynford Philipps. Roch was selected as the Liberal candidate. During the campaign he had the active support of the MPs W. Llewelyn Williams and W. Jones of the United Kingdom Alliance and the Free Trade League respectively. The Miners' Federation of Great Britain also strongly supported Roch. His opponent, John Lort-Williams, the Conservative candidate, was supported by emissaries from the Tariff Reform League and the National Trade Defence Association. The Women's Social and Political Union, led by Emmeline Pankhurst came to Pembrokeshire to campaign against Roch, not because they disliked him, or supported Lort-Williams, but because H.H. Asquith, the Liberal Prime Minister, opposed the enfranchisement of women. In fact, Roch was a supporter of Votes for Women. Roch comfortably held the seat.

Result

Roch successfully contested the seat in Pembrokeshire until 1918.

Later electoral record

Roch was appointed to the Dardanelles Commission in 1916. He was the author of Mr. Lloyd George and the War (1920). In 1934 he was appointed JP for Monmouthshire. He and his wife spent the last twenty-five years of his life on their estates.

References

External links
 
 Walter Francis Roch
 

1880 births
1965 deaths
Liberal Party (UK) MPs for Welsh constituencies
UK MPs 1906–1910
UK MPs 1910
UK MPs 1910–1918
People educated at Harrow School
People educated at Twyford School
Members of the Parliament of the United Kingdom for Pembrokeshire constituencies